Pacific High School may refer to any of the following high schools:
Brooklyn Frontiers High School, formerly the home of Pacific High School, located in Brooklyn, New York
Pacific High School (North Highlands, California), located in North Highlands, California
Pacific High School (Pacific, Missouri), located in Pacific, Missouri
Pacific High School (Port Orford, Oregon)
Pacific High School (San Bernardino, California)
Pacific High School (Sitka, Alaska), located in Sitka, Alaska
Pacific High School (Ventura, California), located in Ventura, California
Pacific High School, fictitious organization run by Axact